Ray Race Cars is a British race car manufacturer. Previously Ray built Formula 3 and Formula Renault cars. The company still produces Formula Ford cars.

History

Ray Race Cars was founded in 1971 by Bert Ray and his brother Frank and his son Gavin.  Stephen South raced the Ray 73F entered by the factory team in various British championships winning four races. With the 74F South won eleven races in 1974. For 1975 South and Ray moved up into Formula 3 with the Ray F375. The car was fitted with a Toyota engine. The best result was a fifth place at Brands Hatch in the 1975 British Formula Three season. Later in the season the team switched to the more competitive March 753 scoring a podium at Thruxton. The Ray F376 for 1976 was announced but never built.

In 1987 Derek Higgins won the BARC Formula Ford Junior championship in the 86F. Higgins won races at Thruxton, Silverstone, Mallory Park, Oulton Park, Snetterton and Cadwell Park. The following season Andy Charsley won two races in the championship.

For 2003 the factory team signed Alx Danielsson and Sukhjit Sandher. Danielsson won three races, all three at Brands Hatch. The Swede finished fourth in the championship standings. It took until 2006 before the constructor won another British Formula Ford race. Cliff Dempsey Racing signed Peter Dempsey who won the first four races of the championship. Dempsey also won the Walter Hayes Trophy in 2006 and 2007. Nick Tandy joined the factory team winning three races. The following year Tandy joined family team JTR winning six races in a Ray GRS07. Partnering with the Team USA Scholarship and Cliff Dempsey Racing Ray Race Cars won the Walter Hayes Trophy again in 2008, 2009, 2010 and 2012.

At the 2009 A1GP round at Brands Hatch Ray Race Cars unveiled the BR09SC Sports 2000. In the 2010 Sports 2000 Duratec championship Damian Griffin raced the Ray car. His best finish was seventh at Rockingham. The car struggled to be competitive in following years.

Scott Malvern was the last driver winning races in the official British Formula Ford championship for Ray Race Cars. In 2010 Malvern won at Oulton Park and Silverstone. For 2011 Ray introduced the GR11. The Lucas Oil School of Racing adopted the car as the car to teach aspiring race drivers. The car was fitted with a 2-liter Elite Engines built engine. Continuing in the local Formula Ford championships James Raven won the Formula Ford Festival in 2014.

Alex Crosbie, driving a GR21, won the New Zealand Formula Ford Championship in April 2022.

Racing cars

References

British racecar constructors
Formula Ford cars
Vehicle manufacturing companies established in 1973
1973 establishments in England
British Formula Three teams